Hystriomyia is a genus of flies in the family Tachinidae.

Species
H. fetissowi Portschinsky, 1881
H. lata Portschinsky, 1882
H. nigrosetosa Zimin, 1931
H. pallida Chao, 1974
H. paradoxa (Zimin, 1935)
H. rubra Chao, 1974

References

Tachininae
Tachinidae genera
Taxa named by Josef Aloizievitsch Portschinsky